Rizospastis ("The Radical") is the official newspaper of the Communist Party of Greece. It has been published daily since its first issue in 1916. Liana Kanelli is currently one of the senior editors of the newspaper.

Motto
"Organ of the Communist Party's Central Committee" and
"Proletarians of all countries unite!"

See also
Nikos Boyiopoulos

References

External links
  

Publications established in 1916
1916 establishments in Greece
Greek-language newspapers
Newspapers published in Athens
Communist newspapers
Communist Party of Greece
Daily newspapers published in Greece